Calyptridium is a genus of flowering plants belonging to the family Montiaceae.

Its native range is Northern America, Southern South America.

Species:
Calyptridium hesseae , syn. Calyptridium parryi var. hesseae 
Calyptridium martirense 
Calyptridium monandrum 
Calyptridium monospermum 
Calyptridium nevadense 
Calyptridium parryi , including Calyptridium arizonicum , syn. Calyptridium parryi var. arizonicum
Calyptridium pulchellum 
Calyptridium pygmaeum 
Calyptridium quadripetalum 
Calyptridium roseum 
Calyptridium umbellatum

References

Montiaceae
Caryophyllales genera